20,000 Leagues Under the Sea is a 1954 American science fiction adventure film directed by Richard Fleischer, from a screenplay by Earl Felton. Adapted from Jules Verne's 1870 novel of the same name, the film was personally produced by Walt Disney through Walt Disney Productions. It stars Kirk Douglas, James Mason, Paul Lukas, and Peter Lorre. Photographed in Technicolor, the film was one of the first feature-length motion pictures to be filmed in CinemaScope. It was also the first feature-length Disney film to be distributed by Buena Vista Distribution.

20,000 Leagues Under the Sea was a critical and commercial success, being especially remembered for the fight with a giant squid, as well as Mason's definitive performance as the charismatic anti-hero Captain Nemo. The film won two Academy Awards for its art direction and special effects. It is considered an early precursor of the steampunk genre.

Plot
In 1868, rumors spread of a sea monster attacking ships in the Pacific Ocean. Professor Aronnax and his assistant, Conseil, are asked to investigate and soon board a U.S. Navy frigate. They are joined by cocky master-harpooner Ned Land.

After months of patrolling, the monster is spotted. The frigate's guncrew open fire with their Dahlgren cannon, but the monster turns and rams the warship. Ned, Conseil, and Aronnax are thrown overboard while the disabled frigate drifts away, unable to respond to their cries for help. While clinging to wreckage, Aronnax and Conseil come upon a metal vessel and realize the monster is a man-made "submerging boat" that now appears deserted. Going below decks, Aronnax finds a large viewport and witnesses an underwater funeral, while Ned Land arrives on an overturned longboat from their ship. Spotted by the divers, Ned, Aronnax, and Conseil attempt to leave in the righted longboat, but the divers stop them. The vessel's captain introduces himself as Nemo, master of the Nautilus. He returns Ned and Conseil to the deck while offering Aronnax, whose name he recognizes, the chance to stay. After Aronnax proves willing to die with his companions, Nemo allows Ned and Conseil to remain aboard.

Nemo takes Nautilus to the penal colony island of Rura Penthe, where the prisoners are loading a munitions ship. Nemo, once a prisoner there as were many of his crew, later rams the steamer, destroying it and its crew. Nemo tells Aronnax that he has just saved thousands from death in war, and that "this hated nation" tortured his wife and son to death while attempting to force him to reveal his discoveries. In Nemo's cabin, Ned and Conseil discover the map coordinates of Nemo's secret island base, Vulcania, where Nautilus is now heading. Ned throws messages overboard in bottles in the hope of being rescued.

Off the coast of New Guinea, Nautilus becomes stranded on a reef. Nemo allows Ned to go ashore with Conseil, ostensibly to collect specimens, while admonishing them to stay on the beach. Ned instead goes exploring for avenues of escape, and finds human skulls posted on stakes. Ned quickly rejoins Conseil, and they row away pursued by cannibals. Aboard Nautilus, the cannibals are repelled by an electrical charge sent through its hull, and Nemo confines Ned for disobeying orders.

A warship fires upon Nautilus, which descends into the depths, attracting a giant squid. After an electric charge fails to repel the creature, Nemo and his men surface during a violent storm to dislodge it. Nemo is caught by one of its long tentacles, and Ned, having escaped from captivity, fatally harpoons the squid, saving Nemo. Having had a change of heart, Nemo wants to make amends with the world.

As Nautilus nears Vulcania, Nemo finds the island surrounded by warships, with marines having disembarked. Nemo submerges Nautilus, enters his base from underwater, and surfaces within its large lagoon. He rushes ashore to activate a prearranged time bomb in order to destroy any evidence of his discoveries, but is shot and mortally wounded. Navigating the submarine to a safe distance from Vulcania, Nemo announces that he will be "taking the Nautilus down for the last time". His crew declare that they will accompany their captain in death.

Aronnax, Conseil, and Ned are confined to their cabins, while Nautiluss crew retreat to their own at Nemo's instructions. Ned escapes and surfaces the submarine, striking a reef in the process, causing Nautilus to flood. Nemo dies while viewing his beloved undersea domain through the hull's viewport.

Aronnax tries retrieving his journal, but the urgency of their escape obliges Ned to knock him unconscious and carry him out. Aboard Nautiluss skiff, the three companions witness Vulcania explode. A large, billowing mushroom cloud rises above the island's destruction. Ned apologizes to Aronnax for striking him, but Aronnax concedes that the loss of his journal might have been for the best. As Nautilus sinks, Nemo's last words to Aronnax echo: "There is hope for the future. And when the world is ready for a new and better life, all this will someday come to pass... in God's good time".

Cast

 Kirk Douglas as Ned Land
 James Mason as Captain Nemo
 Paul Lukas as Professor Pierre Aronnax
 Peter Lorre as Conseil
 Robert J. Wilke as Nautilus First Mate
 Ted de Corsia as Captain Farragut
 Carleton Young as John Howard
 J. M. Kerrigan as Billy
 Percy Helton as Coach driver
 Ted Cooper as Abraham Lincoln First Mate
 Fred Graham as Casey (uncredited stuntman)
 Laurie Mitchell as Hooker (uncredited debut)

Production
Walt Disney first expressed interest in an adaptation of 20,000 Leagues Under the Sea after seeing some marine footage and storyboards created by Harper Goff during the production of the True-Life Adventures series. At the time, the film rights were owned by Metro-Goldwyn-Mayer and King Brothers Productions. In November 1950, independent producer Sid Rogell announced he had acquired the film rights to the novel, as well as a film adaptation prepared by Robert L. Lippert's production company. He had planned to start shooting within a year at the General Service Studios. However, in December 1951, it was reported that Walt Disney had purchased the film rights from Rogell. Goff's storyboards and art designs formed the film's basis, but he was not credited because he's not a member of the International Alliance of Theatrical Stage Employees.

20,000 Leagues Under the Sea was filmed at various locations in The Bahamas and Jamaica, with the cave scenes filmed beneath what is now the Xtabi Resort on the cliffs of Negril. Other scenes were photographed in Nassau, Lyford Cay, and Death Valley. Filming began on January 11, 1954. According to the two-disc DVD documentary, the scenes in San Francisco at the beginning were filmed at Universal Studios while most of the modeling shots were done at 20th Century Fox. Some of the location filming sequences were so complex that they required a technical crew of more than 400 people. The production presented many other challenges, as well. The famous giant squid attack sequence had to be entirely re-shot, as it was originally filmed as taking place at dusk and in a calm sea. The sequence was filmed again, this time taking place at twilight and during a humongous thunderstorm, both to increase the drama and to better hide the cables and other mechanical workings of the Animatronic squid.

With a total (and deeply over-run) production cost of $9 million, 20,000 Leagues Under the Sea was the most expensive and ambitious in Hollywood up to that time. It presented a serious financial risk to the studio should the film flop.

Differences between novel and film

The film was praised as faithfully adapting the novel. James W. Maertens writes that while this is true, "Close comparison of the novel and film reveals many changes, omissions, even reversals, which affect the story's fundamental concern (besides scientific education), a representation of class and gender, specifically masculinity, in the industrial age". Nemo's submarine, battery-powered in the novel, is powered by atomic energy in the film. The novel's submarine is also a "streamlined, cigar shaped sub" while the film's is "a more ornate vessel". The film's director and screenwriter extracted "the most memorable scenes from the novel and freely reordered them under the assumption that viewers would not remember the novel's order of events". Goff and Disney based the Nautilus's design in the film on the interior of the Forth Bridge. In the novel, Nemo orders parts from various industries, secretly shipping them to an island for assembly, whom Maertens labeled "a logistical genius at manipulating Industrial Age manufacturing".

Music
Rather than an authentic soundtrack recording of the film's score or dialogue, two vinyl studio cast record albums were released to coincide with the film's first two releases (1954 and 1963). Both albums contained condensed and heavily altered versions of the film's script without the usage of any of the film's cast for character voices. In addition, both albums were narrated by Ned Land as opposed to Aronnax, who narrated the film and the original novel. Neither album mentioned Nemo as actually being "cracked" (i.e. insane), as the film does, and considerably sanitized the character by omitting any mention of him killing anyone. The albums also had Nemo surviving at the end and releasing Ned, Arronax, and Conseil out of gratitude for their saving his life. In this version, Ned, Aronnax and Conseil were not shipwrecked because the Nautilus rammed the ship they were on, but because a hurricane came up.

The first album was issued in 1954 in conjunction with the film's original release, and starred William Redfield as the voice of Ned. This album, a book-and-record set, was issued as part of RCA Victor's Little Nipper series on two 45-RPM records. The second album, released by Disneyland Records in 1963 in conjunction with the film's first re-release, was issued on one 33 RPM 12-inch LP with no accompanying booklet and no liner notes – the usual practice with most Disneyland label albums. It contained much more of the film's plot, but with many of the same alterations as the first album, so this recording was technically a remake of the earlier one. The cast for the 1963 album was uncredited. Neither album listed the film's credits or made any mention of the film's cast.

A single for the film's most memorable song "A Whale of a Tale", written by Norman Gimbel and Al Hoffman and sung by Kirk Douglas, was also released in 1954 under the Decca Children's Series label. The song "And the Moon Grew Brighter and Brighter", which Douglas had sung in the movie Man Without a Star (written by Lou Singer and Jimmy Kennedy), was the B-side. Both songs can be found on the 2008 digital release of the film's soundtrack. In the film, Johann Sebastian Bach's Toccata and Fugue in D minor is played by Nemo on the Nautilus's organ, but James Mason's playing is actually dubbed by an anonymous organist.

Official soundtrack
On January 29, 2008, Walt Disney Records released a 26-track digital album containing the music of Paul Smith's original soundtrack score to 20,000 Leagues Under the Sea, plus both sides of the "A Whale of a Tale" single, as well as a digital booklet companion that explores the music of the film. This was the first official release of the film score and was initially available only through the iTunes Store. Intrada released the same soundtrack on CD in 2011. The music for 20,000 Leagues Under the Sea was composed by Paul Smith, with Joseph Dubin acting as the orchestrator.

Release

Home media
Over the years, the film has been released on VHS, LaserDisc, SelectaVision videodisc, DVD, and Blu-ray. A 1080p HD version from a 4K restoration was released on iTunes in 2014. In 2019, the film was released on Blu-ray via the Disney Movie Club. The film was available to stream on Disney+ when the service launched on November 12, 2019.

Reception

Box office
20,000 Leagues Under the Sea earned $8 million in North American distributor rentals at the box office, making it the third highest-grossing film of 1954.

Critical reaction
Bosley Crowther of The New York Times stated that, "As fabulous and fantastic as anything he has ever done in cartoons is Walt Disney's 'live action' movie made from Jules Verne's '20,000 Leagues Under the Sea.' Turned out in CinemaScope and color, it is as broad, fictitiously, as it is long (128 minutes), and should prove a sensation—at least with the kids". Gene Arneel of Variety praised the film as "a special kind of picture making, combining photographic ingenuity, imaginative story telling and fiscal daring." He further added that "Richard Fleischer's direction keeps the Disney epic moving at a smart clip, picking up interest right from the start and deftly developing each of the many tense moments...Earl Fenton's screenplay looks to be a combination of the best in the Verne original and new material to suit the screen form. It's a fine job of writing simulating pic fare. Technical credits — underline the water photography — are excellent." Philip K. Scheuer, reviewing for the Los Angeles Times, wrote "Technically the film is a marvel itself, with actual underwater shot made in the Bahamas alternating with surface scale models that defy detection as such." He also praised Mason's performance, claiming "he lends depth and dimension to the stock figure of the 'mad genius.' The proof: he sometimes seems more pitied than scorned." Harrison's Reports wrote that "Expertly utilizing the CinemaScope medium and Technicolor photography, he [Walt Disney] and his staff have fashioned a picture that is not only a masterpiece from the production point of view but also a great entertainment, the kind that should go over in a big way with all types of audiences."

Modern-day film critic Steve Biodrowski said that the film is "far superior to the majority of genre efforts from the period (or any period, for that matter), with production design and technical effects that have dated hardly at all". Biodrowski also added that the film "may occasionally succumb to some of the problems inherent in the source material (the episodic nature does slow the pace), but the strengths far outweigh the weaknesses, making this one of the greatest science-fiction films ever made". On the review aggregator website Rotten Tomatoes, the film has an approval rating of 90% based on 30 reviews, with an average rating of 7.70/10. The website's critical consensus reads: "One of Disney's finest live-action adventures, 20,000 Leagues Under the Sea brings Jules Verne's classic sci-fi tale to vivid life, and features an awesome giant squid".

Accolades

The film's primary art director Harper Goff, who designed the fictitious Nautilus submarine, was not a member of the Art Directors Union. Therefore, under a bylaw within the Academy of Motion Pictures, he was unable to receive his Academy Award for Art Direction.

In Disney resorts

Disneyland used the original sets as a walk-through attraction from 1955 to 1966. Walt Disney World Resort's Magic Kingdom also had a dark ride named 20,000 Leagues Under the Sea: Submarine Voyage from 1971 to 1994 which consisted of a submarine ride, complete with the giant squid attack, and an arrangement of the main theme from the 1954 film playing on Captain Nemo's organ in the background. For this ride, voice artist Peter Renaday stood in for James Mason in the role of Captain Nemo. In 1994, a walkthrough attraction at Disneyland Paris, named Les Mystères du Nautilus, opened, and a dark ride at Tokyo DisneySea was created in 2001.  The exterior to The Little Mermaid: Ariel's Undersea Adventure contains a silhouette of the Nautilus in a rock wall and the tiki bar Trader Sam's Grog Grotto at Disney's Polynesian Village Resort serves a cocktail called the "Nautilus" which is itself served in a stylized drinking vessel resembling the submarine, and features a dive helmet and a mechanical squid tentacle that pours liquor behind the bar.

Comic book adaptation
 Dell Four Color #614 (February 1955)

Remake and prequel
On January 6, 2009, Variety reported that a live-action remake titled 20,000 Leagues Under the Sea: Captain Nemo was being planned with Joseph McGinty Nichol, known as "McG", attached to direct. The film serves as an origin story for Captain Nemo, as he builds his warship, the Nautilus. McG has remarked that it will be "much more in keeping with the spirit of the novel" than Richard Fleischer's film, in which it will reveal "what Aronnax is up to and the becoming of Captain Nemo, and how the man became at war with war itself". It was written by Bill Marsilli, with Justin Marks and Randall Wallace brought in to do rewrites. The film was to be produced by Sean Bailey with McG's Wonderland Sound and Vision.

McG once suggested that he wanted Will Smith as Captain Nemo, but he reportedly turned down the part. As a second possible choice, McG had mentioned Sam Worthington, with whom he worked on Terminator Salvation, though they did not ever discuss it seriously. In November 2009, the project was shelved by then-Walt Disney Pictures chairman Rich Ross after having spent nearly $10 million on pre-production work. Prior to the announcement, McG and Bailey had been notified of the project's cancellation.

During the 2010 San Diego Comic-Con, director David Fincher announced plans of directing 20,000 Leagues Under the Sea for Walt Disney Pictures based on a script by Scott Z. Burns. While Fincher was wrapping up The Girl with the Dragon Tattoo (2011), it was speculated that 20,000 Leagues Under the Sea would enter principal photography by late 2012. In the meantime, Fincher began courting Brad Pitt to play the role of Ned Land while the film was kept on hold. However, in February 2013, it was announced that Pitt had officially turned down the role.

In April 2013, it was announced that the Australian government will provide a one-off incentive of $20 million in order to secure the production. Despite this, the film was put on hold again the following month due to complications in casting a lead. On July 17, 2013, Fincher dropped out of the film to direct the adaptation of Gone Girl. Fincher revealed in an interview that he left the film because he wanted Channing Tatum for Ned Land, but Disney wanted Chris Hemsworth for the role. Additionally, the money originally allocated for the production of this film was redirected towards Pirates of the Caribbean: Dead Men Tell No Tales.

In February 2016, Disney announced that it was planning a live-action film titled Captain Nemo, with James Mangold directing. Mangold moved on from the project to direct Indiana Jones and the Dial of Destiny instead.

On August 23, 2021, it was announced that a ten episode miniseries titled Nautilus entered development. The series will be an origin story about Captain Nemo and will be written by James Dormer, who will co-produce with Johanna Devereaux. On November 12, 2021, Shazad Latif was cast in the lead role while Michael Matthews will direct the series.

See also
 Mysterious Island, a 1961 film by Columbia Pictures, based on Verne's 1874 novel The Mysterious Island, which was a sequel to two of Verne's earlier novels: In Search of the Castaways (also known as Captain Grant's Children) (1867) and Twenty Thousand Leagues Under the Seas (1870)
 In Search of the Castaways, a 1962 Disney film based on Verne's 1867 novel In Search of the Castaways (a.k.a. Captain Grant's Children)
 Atlantis: The Lost Empire, a 2001 Disney animated film that would share much of the same design language as 20,000 Leagues Under the Sea

Notes

References

Bibliography
 Schickel, Richard. The Disney Version: The Life, Times, Art and Commerce of Walt Disney (Third ed.). Chicago: Ivan R. Dee, 1997. .
 Warren, Bill. Keep Watching the Skies: American Science Fiction Films of the Fifties, 21st Century Edition. Jefferson, North Carolina: McFarland & Company, 2009 (First Edition 1982). .

External links

 
 20,000 Leagues Under the Sea at DBCult Film Institute
 

1954 films
1950s science fiction adventure films
American science fiction adventure films
1950s English-language films
Films adapted into comics
Films based on Twenty Thousand Leagues Under the Sea
Films based on science fiction novels
Films directed by Richard Fleischer
Films produced by Walt Disney
Films scored by Paul Smith (film and television composer)
Films set in San Francisco
Films set in the Pacific Ocean
Films set in 1868
Films shot in Jamaica
Films shot in the Bahamas
Films that won the Best Visual Effects Academy Award
Films whose art director won the Best Art Direction Academy Award
Sea adventure films
Underwater civilizations in fiction
Walt Disney Pictures films
CinemaScope films
Films set in New Guinea
1950s American films